Chou Min (born 1900) was a Chinese educator and politician. She was among the first group of women elected to the Legislative Yuan in 1948.

Biography
Born in 1900 and originally from Luotian County in Hubei province, Chou attended  and subsequently worked as a teacher at Hebei Provincial Women's Normal School and National Central University. She became headmistress of Hubei Provincial Women's Normal School and founded Hankou City No. 1 Girls' High School and Hubei Provincial No. 2 Girls' Normal School, serving as headmistress of both.

Chou served for two terms in the Provisional Senate of Hubei and as a member of the provincial government. She was a Kuomintang candidate in Hubei province in the 1948 elections for the Legislative Yuan and was elected to parliament. She relocated to Taiwan during the Chinese Civil War, where she remained a member of the Legislative Yuan.

References

1900 births
Academic staff of the National Central University
Chinese schoolteachers
20th-century Chinese women politicians
Members of the Kuomintang
Members of the 1st Legislative Yuan
Members of the 1st Legislative Yuan in Taiwan
Date of death unknown